"The Last Days of John Brown" is an essay by Henry David Thoreau, written in 1860, that praised the executed abolitionist militia leader John Brown.

See also 
 "A Plea for Captain John Brown"
 "Remarks After the Hanging of John Brown"

On-line sources 
 * The Last Days of John Brown at The Picket Line
 The Last Days of John Brown at Wikisource

Printed sources 
 A Yankee in Canada with Anti-Slavery and Reform Papers
 My Thoughts are Murder to the State by Henry David Thoreau
 The Higher Law: Thoreau on Civil Disobedience and Reform
 Collected Essays and Poems by Henry David Thoreau

Essays by Henry David Thoreau
1860 essays